In mathematics, a pre-Lie algebra is an algebraic structure on a vector space that describes some properties of objects such as rooted trees and vector fields on affine space.

The notion of pre-Lie algebra has been introduced by Murray Gerstenhaber in his work on deformations of algebras.

Pre-Lie algebras have been considered under some other names, among which one can cite left-symmetric algebras, right-symmetric algebras or Vinberg algebras.

Definition 
A pre-Lie algebra  is a vector space  with a bilinear map , satisfying the relation

Every associative algebra is hence also a pre-Lie algebra, as the associator vanishes identically.  Although weaker than associativity, the defining relation of a pre-Lie algebra still implies that the commutator  is a Lie bracket.  In particular, the Jacobi identity for the commutator follows from cycling the  terms in the defining relation for pre-Lie algebras, above.

Examples

Vector fields on an affine space 

Given vector fields ,  we define .  

Thus  defines a pre-Lie algebra structure.

Rooted trees 

Let  be the free vector space spanned by all rooted trees.

Let  and  be two rooted trees.

Then  is a free pre-Lie algebra on one generator. More generally, the free pre-Lie algebra on any set of generators is constructed the same way from trees with each vertex labelled by one of the generators.

References
.
.

Lie groups
 
Non-associative algebra